James Nicholas Miller (born 18 September 1976) is an English cricketer. He was a right-handed batsman who played for Northumberland in List A and Minor Counties cricket. He was born in North Shields.

Miller made a single List A appearance for Northumberland in the C&G Trophy against Staffordshire.

His last Minor Counties appearance for Northumberland was in 2006.

References

External links
James Miller at Cricket Archive

1976 births
Living people
English cricketers
Northumberland cricketers
Sportspeople from North Shields
Cricketers from Tyne and Wear